Rafał Śliż (born 11 July 1983) is a Polish ski jumper.

He made his Continental Cup debut in January 2004, his best result being a first place from Sapporo in January 2006 as well as two victories in Rovaniemi in December 2006. He also finished seventh in the large hill at the 2005 Winter Universiade.

He made his World Cup debut in January 2005 in Zakopane, and collected his first World Cup points with a 26th place in January 2006 in Innsbruck. His best result is a thirteenth place in January 2009 in Zakopane.

References
 

1983 births
Living people
Polish male ski jumpers
Olympic ski jumpers of Poland
Ski jumpers at the 2006 Winter Olympics
People from Wisła
Sportspeople from Silesian Voivodeship
21st-century Polish people